Clams oreganata is an Italian American seafood dish served most commonly as an appetizer. The dish consists of a number of clams (usually six or twelve) that are topped with bread crumbs (usually moistened with olive oil or butter), oregano and sometimes other ingredients, and baked. Lemons are often included so that lemon juice can be squeezed onto the clams immediately before eating. The name "oreganata" comes from the addition of oregano to the bread crumbs.

Clams oreganata is commonly eaten on Christmas Eve during the Feast of the Seven Fishes, a traditional Italian-American meal centered around various seafood dishes.

See also

 Clams casino
 List of clam dishes
 List of seafood dishes
 New England clam bake

References

Further reading
 

Oreganata
Italian-American cuisine
Christmas food